Breaux Greer (born October 19, 1976) is a retired American track and field athlete who competed in the javelin throw. He is the current American record holder in the event, with a throw of 91.29 m (299.5 ft), achieved on June 21, 2007, at the 2007 USA Outdoor Championships. With it, he is currently ranked as the #15 thrower in history.  This was also the best throw in the world for almost eight years until surpassed by Julius Yego in 2015. He is an eight-time American Champion, consecutively 2000 – 2007. His coach was Finnish javelin thrower Kari Ihalainen.

Greer appeared on the second season of the 2008 version of American Gladiators as Hurricane.

Achievements

Quotes

Personal life
Greer and his wife, actress Katy Mixon, had a son in May 2017 and a daughter in May 2018.

References

External links

Breaux Greer at USATF

1976 births
Living people
American male javelin throwers
Athletes (track and field) at the 2000 Summer Olympics
Athletes (track and field) at the 2004 Summer Olympics
Athletes (track and field) at the 2008 Summer Olympics
Athletes (track and field) at the 2003 Pan American Games
Olympic track and field athletes of the United States
People from Houston
World Athletics Championships medalists
Pan American Games medalists in athletics (track and field)
Pan American Games bronze medalists for the United States
Goodwill Games medalists in athletics
Competitors at the 2001 Goodwill Games
Medalists at the 2003 Pan American Games